Ido is a Local Government Area in Oyo State, Nigeria. Its headquarters are in the town of Ido.

It has an area of 986 km² and a population of 103,261 at the 2006 census. Ido Local Government was among the five in Ibadan district before it was cancelled in 1956. Other four Local Governments that were in existence at that time were Mapo, Akinyele, Ona-ara and Olode-Olojumon. Mapo was the headquarters for all the Local Governments by then, which was called Ibadan City Council (ICC).

In respect of the state administration policy of bringing government and development to the grassroots level, and in response to the yearning and aspirations of the people, Ido Local Government finally came into being in May, 1989. The Local Government, with its headquarters at Ido, was carved out of the former Akinyele Local Government. The area was referred to as Akinleye West Local Government (1981-1983) during the second Republic before it was merged again with Akinyele Local Government by the Buhari/Idiagbon regime in 1984. The Local Government has an area of 986km2 and a total population of 103,261 based on 2006 National Population Census.

The council was administered under the sole administrator-ship system from May to July 1989 and Caretaker Committee system from July 1989 to December 8, 1990. With the formation of the two political parties, Social Democratic Party (SDP) and National Republican Convention (NRC), the administration of Ido Local Government was handed over to democratically elected leaders. Ido Local Government covers the area spanning Apata, Ijokodo, Omi-Adio, Akufo and Apete. It shares boundaries with Oluyole, Ibarapa East, Akinyele, Ibadan South-West and Ibadan North-West Local Governments in Oyo State and Odeda Local Government in Ogun State. The council formerly has six wards, which had been increased to ten for easy exercise of franchise. Among the major towns within the local Government Area are Ijokodo, Ido, Omi-Adio, Apata, Apete, Akufo and Bakatari as well as about 612 villages which include Ogunweide, Dada, Olowofela, Apooyin, Oderemi, Odetola, Erinwusi, Tade, Alagbaa, Iku-senla, Aloko among others. On the account of extensive fertile soil, which is suitable for agriculture, the basic occupation of the people is farming. There are large hectares of grassland which are suitable for animal rearing, vast forest reserves and rivers. People in the area grow varieties of cash crops such as cocoa, kola nut, palm oil, timber and food crops such as maize and rice. The area is also suitable for a wide range of edible fruits. In fact, Ido Local Government can serve as the ”food basket of the state” if well utilized.

The area has also gained tremendously from industrialization process with the presence of industries such as the Nigerian Wire and Cable Ltd, Nigerian Mining Corporation and the NNPC among others. The Local Government area has 75 primary schools, 33 secondary schools- made up of 18 junior secondary schools and 15 senior secondary schools.

The postal code of the area is 200.

References

Immediate past Chairman of Ido Local Government is Dr. Adeniyi Olowofela

Local Government Areas in Oyo State